Ouaquaga Lenticular Truss Bridge is a historic lenticular truss bridge located at Ouaquaga in the towns of Windsor and Colesville in Broome County, New York. It was constructed in 1888 and spans the Susquehanna River. It was constructed by the Berlin Iron Bridge Co. of East Berlin, Connecticut. The bridge was closed to vehicular traffic in 2008 when a new bridge was built alongside it. The old bridge remains open for pedestrian use.

It was listed on the National Register of Historic Places in 2003.

See also
List of bridges documented by the Historic American Engineering Record in New York (state)
South Washington Street Parabolic Bridge, a three-span, similar bridge in Binghamton

References

External links

Transportation buildings and structures in Broome County, New York
Lenticular truss bridges in the United States
Bridges completed in 1888
Road bridges on the National Register of Historic Places in New York (state)
National Register of Historic Places in Broome County, New York
History of Broome County, New York
Historic American Engineering Record in New York (state)